SOKO München (until 2015: SOKO 5113) is a German police procedural television series that first aired on 2 January 1978 on ZDF. "SOKO" is an abbreviation of the German word Sonderkommission, which means "special investigative team". Production of the show ended in 2020, after forty-two years.

Crossover
On 3 April 2013, five SOKO teams were brought together for a five-part special titled SOKO – Der Prozess. In it, the teams from Munich, Cologne, Leipzig, Stuttgart, and Wismar have to solve the murder of a police officer. The five episodes were shown across Germany from 30 September to 4 October 2013.

Longest-serving cast
 Wilfried Klaus as Chief Inspector Horst Schickl (381 episodes, 1978–2008)
 Hartmut Schreier as Chief Inspector Manne Brand (278 episodes, 1992–2008)
 Michel Guillaume as Chief Inspector Theo Renner (261 episodes, 1993–2008)
 Werner Kreindl as Chief Inspector Karl Göttmann (126 episodes, 1978–1992)
 Christine Döring as Chief Inspector Susanne von Hagenberg (118 episodes, 2000–2008)
 Bernd Herzsprung as Chief Detective Fred Less (115 episodes, 1978–2008)

Spin-offs
The first spin-off of SOKO München was a twelve-part series named Solo für Sudmann, launched in 1997. This was followed by various SOKO series based in different cities in Germany and Austria:
Leipzig Homicide (SOKO Leipzig, since 2001)
SOKO Kitzbühel (2001–2021)
SOKO Köln (SOKO Köln, since 2003)
SOKO Wismar (since 2004)
SOKO Donau (in Germany SOKO Wien; since 2005)
SOKO Rhein-Main (2006–2007; initially titled Die Spezialisten: Kripo Rhein-Main)
SOKO Stuttgart (since 2009)
SOKO Potsdam (since 2018)
SOKO Hamburg (since 2018)
SOKO Linz (since 2021)

See also
 List of German television series

References

External links
 

German crime television series
1970s German police procedural television series
1980s German police procedural television series
1990s German police procedural television series
2000s German police procedural television series
2010s German police procedural television series
2020s German police procedural television series
1978 German television series debuts
2020 German television series endings
1980s German television series
1990s German television series
2000s German television series
2010s German television series
Television shows set in Munich
German-language television shows
ZDF original programming